Vadym Vadymovych Merdyeyev (born 13 August 2002) is a Ukrainian professional footballer who plays as a right winger for Ukrainian club Uzhhorod.

References

External links
 
 

2002 births
Living people
Ukrainian footballers
Association football forwards
FC Karpaty Lviv players
FC Karpaty Halych players
FC Uzhhorod players
FC Khust players
Ukrainian First League players
Ukrainian Second League players
Sportspeople from Zakarpattia Oblast